NA-184 Taunsa-cum-Dera Ghazi Khan is a constituency for the National Assembly of Pakistan.

Election 2002 

General elections were held on 10 Oct 2002. Owais Ahmad Khan Leghari of National Alliance won by 55,921 votes.

Election 2008 

General elections were held on 18 Feb 2008. Sardar Saif-ud-din Khosa of PML-N won by 56,475 votes.

Election 2013 

General elections were held on 11 May 2013. Owais Ahmad Khan Leghari of PML-N won by 82,521 votes and became the  member of National Assembly.

Election 2018 

General elections are scheduled to be held on 25 July 2018.

See also
NA-183 Taunsa
NA-185 Dera Ghazi Khan-I

References

External links 
Election result's official website

NA-173